Isaac Asimov (1920 – April 6, 1992) was an American writer and professor of biochemistry at Boston University. During his lifetime, Asimov was considered one of the "Big Three" science fiction writers, along with Robert A. Heinlein and Arthur C. Clarke. A prolific writer, he wrote or edited more than 500 books. He also wrote an estimated 90,000 letters and postcards. Best known for his hard science fiction, Asimov also wrote mysteries and fantasy, as well as much nonfiction.

Asimov's most famous work is the Foundation series, the first three books of which won the one-time Hugo Award for "Best All-Time Series" in 1966. His other major series are the Galactic Empire series and the Robot series. The Galactic Empire novels are set in the much earlier history of the same fictional universe as the Foundation series. Later, with Foundation and Earth (1986), he linked this distant future to the Robot series, creating a unified "future history" for his works. He also wrote over 380 short stories, including the social science fiction novelette "Nightfall", which in 1964 was voted the best short science fiction story of all time by the Science Fiction Writers of America. Asimov wrote the Lucky Starr series of juvenile science-fiction novels using the pen name Paul French.

Most of his popular science books explain concepts in a historical way, going as far back as possible to a time when the science in question was at its simplest stage. Examples include Guide to Science, the three-volume Understanding Physics, and Asimov's Chronology of Science and Discovery. He wrote on numerous other scientific and non-scientific topics, such as chemistry, astronomy, mathematics, history, biblical exegesis, and literary criticism.

He was the president of the American Humanist Association. Several entities have been named in his honor, including the asteroid (5020) Asimov, a crater on Mars, a Brooklyn elementary school, Honda's humanoid robot ASIMO, and four literary awards.

Surname

Azimov is spelled  in the Cyrillic alphabet. When the family arrived in the United States in 1923 and their name had to be spelled in the Latin alphabet, Asimov's father spelled it with an S, believing this letter to be pronounced like Z (as in German), and so it became Asimov. This later inspired one of Asimov's short stories, "Spell My Name with an S".

Asimov refused early suggestions of using a more common name as a pseudonym, and believed that its recognizability helped his career. After becoming famous, he often met readers who believed that "Isaac Asimov" was a distinctive pseudonym created by an author with a common name.

Life

Early life 
Asimov was born in Petrovichi, Russian SFSR, on an unknown date between October 4, 1919, and January 2, 1920, inclusive. Asimov celebrated his birthday on January 2.

Asimov's parents were Anna Rachel (née Berman) and Judah Asimov, a family of Russian Jewish millers. He was named Isaac after his mother's father, Isaac Berman. Asimov wrote of his father, "My father, for all his education as an Orthodox Jew, was not Orthodox in his heart", noting that "he didn't recite the myriad prayers prescribed for every action, and he never made any attempt to teach them to me".

In 1921, Asimov and 16 other children in Petrovichi developed double pneumonia. Only Asimov survived. He later had two younger siblings: a sister, Marcia (born Manya; June 17, 1922 – April 2, 2011), and a brother, Stanley (July 25, 1929 – August 16, 1995), who was vice-president of the Long Island Newsday.

Asimov's family travelled to the United States via Liverpool on the RMS Baltic, arriving on February 3, 1923 when he was three years old. His parents spoke Yiddish and English to him; he never learned Russian, his parents using it as a secret language "when they wanted to discuss something privately that my big ears were not to hear". Growing up in Brooklyn, New York, Asimov taught himself to read at the age of five (and later taught his sister to read as well, enabling her to enter school in the second grade). His mother got him into first grade a year early by claiming he was born on September 7, 1919. In third grade he learned about the "error" and insisted on an official correction of the date to January 2. He became a naturalized U.S. citizen in 1928 at the age of eight.

After becoming established in the U.S., his parents owned a succession of candy stores in which everyone in the family was expected to work. The candy stores sold newspapers and magazines, which Asimov credited as a major influence in his lifelong love of the written word, as it presented him with an unending supply of new reading material (including pulp science fiction magazines) as a child that he could not have otherwise afforded. Asimov began reading science fiction at age nine, at the time that the genre was becoming more science-centered. Asimov was also a frequent patron of the Brooklyn Public Library during his formative years.

Education and career 
Asimov attended New York City public schools from age five, including Boys High School in Brooklyn. Graduating at 15, he attended the City College of New York for several days before accepting a scholarship at Seth Low Junior College. This was a branch of Columbia University in Downtown Brooklyn designed to absorb some of the academically qualified Jewish and Italian-American students who applied to the more prestigious Columbia College, but exceeded the unwritten ethnic admission quotas which were common at the time. Originally a zoology major, Asimov switched to chemistry after his first semester because he disapproved of "dissecting an alley cat". After Seth Low Junior College closed in 1936, Asimov finished his Bachelor of Science degree at Columbia's Morningside Heights campus (later the Columbia University School of General Studies) in 1939.

After two rounds of rejections by medical schools, Asimov applied to the graduate program in chemistry at Columbia in 1939; initially he was rejected and then only accepted on a probationary basis, he completed his Master of Arts degree in chemistry in 1941 and earned a Doctor of Philosophy degree in chemistry in 1948. During his chemistry studies, he also learned French and German.

In between earning these two degrees, Asimov spent three years during World War II working as a civilian chemist at the Philadelphia Navy Yard's Naval Air Experimental Station, living in the Walnut Hill section of West Philadelphia from 1942 to 1945. In September 1945, he was drafted into the post-war U.S. Army; if he had not had his birth date corrected while at school, he would have been officially 26 years old and ineligible. In 1946, a bureaucratic error caused his military allotment to be stopped, and he was removed from a task force days before it sailed to participate in Operation Crossroads nuclear weapons tests at Bikini Atoll. He served for almost nine months before receiving an honorable discharge on July 26, 1946. He had been promoted to corporal on July 11.

After completing his doctorate and a postdoc year with Dr. Robert Elderfield, Asimov was offered the position of associate professor of biochemistry at the Boston University School of Medicine. This was in large part due to his years-long correspondence with Dr. William Boyd, a former associate professor of biochemistry at Boston University, who first reached out to compliment Asimov on his story Nightfall. Upon receiving a promotion to professor of immunochemistry, Boyd reached out to Asimov, requesting him to be his replacement. Unfortunately, the initial offer of professorship was withdrawn and Asimov was offered the position of instructor of biochemistry instead, which he accepted. He began work in 1949 with a $5,000 salary, maintaining this position for several years. By 1952, however, he was making more money as a writer than from the university, and he eventually stopped doing research, confining his university role to lecturing students. In 1955, he was promoted to tenured associate professor. In December 1957, Asimov was dismissed from his teaching post, with effect from June 30, 1958, because he had stopped doing research. After a struggle which lasted for two years, he kept his title, he gave the opening lecture each year for a biochemistry class, and on October 18, 1979, the university honored his writing by promoting him to full professor of biochemistry. Asimov's personal papers from 1965 onward are archived at the university's Mugar Memorial Library, to which he donated them at the request of curator Howard Gotlieb.

In 1959, after a recommendation from Arthur Obermayer, Asimov's friend and a scientist on the U.S. missile defense project, Asimov was approached by DARPA to join Obermayer's team. Asimov declined on the grounds that his ability to write freely would be impaired should he receive classified information, but submitted a paper to DARPA titled "On Creativity" containing ideas on how government-based science projects could encourage team members to think more creatively.

Personal life 
Asimov met his first wife, Gertrude Blugerman (1917, Toronto, Canada – 1990, Boston, U.S.), on a blind date on February 14, 1942, and married her on July 26. The couple lived in an apartment in West Philadelphia while Asimov was employed at the Philadelphia Navy Yard (where two of his co-workers were L. Sprague de Camp and Robert A. Heinlein). Gertrude returned to Brooklyn while he was in the army, and they both lived there from July 1946 before moving to Stuyvesant Town, Manhattan, in July 1948. They moved to Boston in May 1949, then to nearby suburbs Somerville in July 1949, Waltham in May 1951, and, finally, West Newton in 1956. They had two children, David (born 1951) and Robyn Joan (born 1955). In 1970, they separated and Asimov moved back to New York, this time to the Upper West Side of Manhattan where he lived for the rest of his life. He began seeing Janet O. Jeppson, a psychiatrist and science-fiction writer, and married her on November 30, 1973, two weeks after his divorce from Gertrude.

Asimov was a claustrophile: he enjoyed small, enclosed spaces. In the third volume of his autobiography, he recalls a childhood desire to own a magazine stand in a New York City Subway station, within which he could enclose himself and listen to the rumble of passing trains while reading.

Asimov was afraid of flying, doing so only twice: once in the course of his work at the Naval Air Experimental Station and once returning home from Oahu in 1946. Consequently, he seldom traveled great distances. This phobia influenced several of his fiction works, such as the Wendell Urth mystery stories and the Robot novels featuring Elijah Baley. In his later years, Asimov found enjoyment traveling on cruise ships, beginning in 1972 when he viewed the Apollo 17 launch from a cruise ship. On several cruises, he was part of the entertainment program, giving science-themed talks aboard ships such as the Queen Elizabeth 2.

Asimov was an able public speaker and was regularly hired to give talks about science. He was a frequent participant at science fiction conventions, where he was friendly and approachable. He patiently answered tens of thousands of questions and other mail with postcards and was pleased to give autographs. He was of medium height, stocky, with—in his later years—"mutton-chop" sideburns, and a distinct New York accent. He took to wearing bolo ties after his wife Janet objected to his clip-on bow ties. He never learned to swim or ride a bicycle, but learned to drive a car after he moved to Boston. In his humor book Asimov Laughs Again, he describes Boston driving as "anarchy on wheels".

Asimov's wide interests included his participation in his later years in organizations devoted to the comic operas of Gilbert and Sullivan and in The Wolfe Pack, a group of devotees of the Nero Wolfe mysteries written by Rex Stout. Many of his short stories mention or quote Gilbert and Sullivan. He was a prominent member of The Baker Street Irregulars, the leading Sherlock Holmes society, for whom he wrote an essay arguing that Professor Moriarty's work "The Dynamics of An Asteroid" involved the willful destruction of an ancient, civilized planet. He was also a member of the male-only literary banqueting club the Trap Door Spiders, which served as the basis of his fictional group of mystery solvers, the Black Widowers. He later used his essay on Moriarty's work as the basis for a Black Widowers story, "The Ultimate Crime", which appeared in More Tales of the Black Widowers.

In 1984, the American Humanist Association (AHA) named him the Humanist of the Year. He was one of the signers of the Humanist Manifesto. From 1985 until his death in 1992, he served as president of the AHA, an honorary appointment. His successor was his friend and fellow writer Kurt Vonnegut. He was also a close friend of Star Trek creator Gene Roddenberry, and earned a screen credit as "special science consultant" on Star Trek: The Motion Picture for advice he gave during production.

Asimov was a founding member of the Committee for the Scientific Investigation of Claims of the Paranormal, CSICOP (now the Committee for Skeptical Inquiry) and is listed in its Pantheon of Skeptics. In a discussion with James Randi at CSICon 2016 regarding the founding of CSICOP, Kendrick Frazier said that Asimov was "a key figure in the Skeptical movement who is less well known and appreciated today, but was very much in the public eye back then." He said that Asimov being associated with CSICOP "gave it immense status and authority" in his eyes.

Asimov described Carl Sagan as one of only two people he ever met whose intellect surpassed his own. The other, he claimed, was the computer scientist and artificial intelligence expert Marvin Minsky. Asimov was a long-time member and vice president of Mensa International, albeit reluctantly; he described some members of that organization as "brain-proud and aggressive about their IQs".

After his father died in 1969, Asimov annually contributed to a Judah Asimov Scholarship Fund at Brandeis University.

Illness and death 
In 1977, Asimov suffered a heart attack. In December 1983, he had triple bypass surgery at NYU Medical Center, during which he contracted HIV from a blood transfusion. His HIV status was kept secret out of concern that the anti-AIDS prejudice might extend to his family members.

He died in Manhattan on April 6, 1992, and was cremated. The cause of death was reported as heart and kidney failure. Ten years following Asimov's death, Janet and Robyn Asimov agreed that the HIV story should be made public; Janet revealed it in her edition of his autobiography, It's Been a Good Life.

Writings

Overview 

Asimov's career can be divided into several periods. His early career, dominated by science fiction, began with short stories in 1939 and novels in 1950. This lasted until about 1958, all but ending after publication of The Naked Sun (1957). He began publishing nonfiction as co-author of a college-level textbook called Biochemistry and Human Metabolism. Following the brief orbit of the first man-made satellite Sputnik I by the USSR in 1957, he wrote more nonfiction, particularly popular science books, and less science fiction. Over the next quarter-century, he wrote only four science fiction novels, and 120 nonfiction books.

Starting in 1982, the second half of his science fiction career began with the publication of Foundation's Edge. From then until his death, Asimov published several more sequels and prequels to his existing novels, tying them together in a way he had not originally anticipated, making a unified series. There are many inconsistencies in this unification, especially in his earlier stories. Doubleday and Houghton Mifflin published about 60% of his work as of 1969, Asimov stating that "both represent a father image".

Asimov believed his most enduring contributions would be his "Three Laws of Robotics" and the Foundation series. The Oxford English Dictionary credits his science fiction for introducing into the English language the words "robotics", "positronic" (an entirely fictional technology), and "psychohistory" (which is also used for a different study on historical motivations). Asimov coined the term "robotics" without suspecting that it might be an original word; at the time, he believed it was simply the natural analogue of words such as mechanics and hydraulics, but for robots. Unlike his word "psychohistory", the word "robotics" continues in mainstream technical use with Asimov's original definition. Star Trek: The Next Generation featured androids with "positronic brains" and the first-season episode "Datalore" called the positronic brain "Asimov's dream".

Asimov was so prolific and diverse in his writing that his books span all major categories of the Dewey Decimal Classification except for category 100, philosophy and psychology. He wrote several essays about psychology, and forewords for the books The Humanist Way (1988) and In Pursuit of Truth (1982), which were classified in the 100s category, but none of his own books were classified in that category.

According to UNESCO's Index Translationum database, Asimov is the world's 24th-most-translated author.

Science fiction 

Asimov became a science fiction fan in 1929, when he began reading the pulp magazines sold in his family's candy store. At first his father forbade reading pulps until Asimov persuaded him that because the science fiction magazines had "Science" in the title, they must be educational. At age 18 he joined the Futurians science fiction fan club, where he made friends who went on to become science fiction writers or editors.

Asimov began writing at the age of 11, imitating The Rover Boys with eight chapters of The Greenville Chums at College. His father bought him a used typewriter at age 16. His first published work was a humorous item on the birth of his brother for Boys High School's literary journal in 1934. In May 1937 he first thought of writing professionally, and began writing his first science fiction story, "Cosmic Corkscrew" (now lost), that year. On May 17, 1938, puzzled by a change in the schedule of Astounding Science Fiction, Asimov visited its publisher Street & Smith Publications. Inspired by the visit, he finished the story on June 19, 1938, and personally submitted it to Astounding editor John W. Campbell two days later. Campbell met with Asimov for more than an hour and promised to read the story himself. Two days later he received a detailed rejection letter. This was the first of what became almost weekly meetings with the editor while Asimov lived in New York, until moving to Boston in 1949; Campbell had a strong formative influence on Asimov and became a personal friend.

By the end of the month, Asimov completed a second story, "Stowaway". Campbell rejected it on July 22 but—in "the nicest possible letter you could imagine"—encouraged him to continue writing, promising that Asimov might sell his work after another year and a dozen stories of practice. On October 21, 1938, he sold the third story he finished, "Marooned Off Vesta", to Amazing Stories, edited by Raymond A. Palmer, and it appeared in the March 1939 issue. Asimov was paid $64, or one cent a word. Two more stories appeared that year, "The Weapon Too Dreadful to Use" in the May Amazing and "Trends" in the July Astounding, the issue fans later selected as the start of the Golden Age of Science Fiction. For 1940, ISFDB catalogs seven stories in four different pulp magazines, including one in Astounding. His earnings became enough to pay for his education, but not yet enough for him to become a full-time writer.

Asimov later said that unlike other Golden Age writers Robert Heinlein and A. E. van Vogt—also first published in 1939, and whose talent and stardom were immediately obvious—he "(this is not false modesty) came up only gradually". Through July 29, 1940, Asimov wrote 22 stories in 25 months, of which 13 were published; he wrote in 1972 that from that date he never wrote a science fiction story that was not published (except for two "special cases"). By 1941 Asimov was famous enough that Donald Wollheim told him that he purchased "The Secret Sense" for a new magazine only because of his name, and the December 1940 issue of Astonishing—featuring Asimov's name in bold—was the first magazine to base cover art on his work, but Asimov later said that neither he nor anyone else—except perhaps Campbell—considered him better than an often published "third rater".

Based on a conversation with Campbell, Asimov wrote "Nightfall", his 32nd story, in March and April 1941, and Astounding published it in September 1941. In 1968 the Science Fiction Writers of America voted "Nightfall" the best science fiction short story ever written. In Nightfall and Other Stories Asimov wrote, "The writing of 'Nightfall' was a watershed in my professional career ... I was suddenly taken seriously and the world of science fiction became aware that I existed. As the years passed, in fact, it became evident that I had written a 'classic'." "Nightfall" is an archetypal example of social science fiction, a term he created to describe a new trend in the 1940s, led by authors including him and Heinlein, away from gadgets and space opera and toward speculation about the human condition.

After writing "Victory Unintentional" in January and February 1942, Asimov did not write another story for a year. Asimov expected to make chemistry his career, and was paid $2,600 annually at the Philadelphia Navy Yard, enough to marry his girlfriend; he did not expect to make much more from writing than the $1,788.50 he had earned from 28 stories sold over four years. Asimov left science fiction fandom and no longer read new magazines, and might have left the industry had not Heinlein and de Camp been coworkers and previously sold stories continued to appear. In 1942, Asimov published the first of his Foundation stories—later collected in the Foundation trilogy: Foundation (1951), Foundation and Empire (1952), and Second Foundation (1953). The books describe the fall of a vast interstellar empire and the establishment of its eventual successor. They also feature his fictional science of psychohistory, in which the future course of the history of large populations can be predicted.

The trilogy and Robot series are his most famous science fiction. In 1966 they won the Hugo Award for the all-time best series of science fiction and fantasy novels. Campbell raised his rate per word, Orson Welles purchased rights to "Evidence", and anthologies reprinted his stories. By the end of the war Asimov was earning as a writer an amount equal to half of his Navy Yard salary, even after a raise, but Asimov still did not believe that writing could support him, his wife, and future children.

His "positronic" robot stories—many of which were collected in I, Robot (1950)—were begun at about the same time. They promulgated a set of rules of ethics for robots (see Three Laws of Robotics) and intelligent machines that greatly influenced other writers and thinkers in their treatment of the subject. Asimov notes in his introduction to the short story collection The Complete Robot (1982) that he was largely inspired by the tendency of robots up to that time to fall consistently into a Frankenstein plot in which they destroyed their creators.

The Robot series has led to film adaptations. With Asimov's collaboration, in about 1977, Harlan Ellison wrote a screenplay of I, Robot that Asimov hoped would lead to "the first really adult, complex, worthwhile science fiction film ever made". The screenplay has never been filmed and was eventually published in book form in 1994. The 2004 movie I, Robot, starring Will Smith, was based on an unrelated script by Jeff Vintar titled Hardwired, with Asimov's ideas incorporated later after the rights to Asimov's title were acquired. (The title was not original to Asimov but had previously been used for a story by Eando Binder.) Also, one of Asimov's robot short stories, "The Bicentennial Man", was expanded into a novel The Positronic Man by Asimov and Robert Silverberg, and this was adapted into the 1999 movie Bicentennial Man, starring Robin Williams.

Besides movies, his Foundation and Robot stories have inspired other derivative works of science fiction literature, many by well-known and established authors such as Roger MacBride Allen, Greg Bear, Gregory Benford, David Brin, and Donald Kingsbury. At least some of these appear to have been done with the blessing of, or at the request of, Asimov's widow, Janet Asimov.

In 1948, he also wrote a spoof chemistry article, "The Endochronic Properties of Resublimated Thiotimoline". At the time, Asimov was preparing his own doctoral dissertation, and for the oral examination to follow that. Fearing a prejudicial reaction from his graduate school evaluation board at Columbia University, Asimov asked his editor that it be released under a pseudonym, yet it appeared under his own name. Asimov grew concerned at the scrutiny he would receive at his oral examination, in case the examiners thought he wasn't taking science seriously. At the end of the examination, one evaluator turned to him, smiling, and said, "What can you tell us, Mr. Asimov, about the thermodynamic properties of the compound known as thiotimoline". Laughing hysterically with relief, Asimov had to be led out of the room. After a five-minute wait, he was summoned back into the room and congratulated as "Dr. Asimov".

Demand for science fiction greatly increased during the 1950s. It became possible for a genre author to write full-time. In 1949, book publisher Doubleday's science fiction editor Walter I. Bradbury accepted Asimov's unpublished "Grow Old with Me" (40,000 words), but requested that it be extended to a full novel of 70,000 words. The book appeared under the Doubleday imprint in January 1950 with the title of Pebble in the Sky. Doubleday published five more original science fiction novels by Asimov in the 1950s, along with the six juvenile Lucky Starr novels, the latter under the pseudonym of "Paul French". Doubleday also published collections of Asimov's short stories, beginning with The Martian Way and Other Stories in 1955. The early 1950s also saw Gnome Press publish one collection of Asimov's positronic robot stories as I, Robot and his Foundation stories and novelettes as the three books of the Foundation trilogy. More positronic robot stories were republished in book form as The Rest of the Robots.

Books and the magazines Galaxy and Fantasy & Science Fiction ended Asimov's dependence on Astounding. He later described the era as his "'mature' period". Asimov's "The Last Question" (1956), on the ability of humankind to cope with and potentially reverse the process of entropy, was his personal favorite story.

In 1972, his novel The Gods Themselves (which was not part of a series) was published to general acclaim, and it won the Hugo Award for Best Novel, the Nebula Award for Best Novel, and the Locus Award for Best Novel.

In December 1974, former Beatle Paul McCartney approached Asimov and asked him if he could write the screenplay for a science-fiction movie musical. McCartney had a vague idea for the plot and a small scrap of dialogue; he wished to make a film about a rock band whose members discover they are being impersonated by a group of extraterrestrials. The band and their impostors would likely be played by McCartney's group Wings, then at the height of their career. Intrigued by the idea, although he was not generally a fan of rock music, Asimov quickly produced a "treatment" or brief outline of the story. He adhered to McCartney's overall idea, producing a story he felt to be moving and dramatic, but did not use McCartney's brief scrap of dialogue. McCartney rejected the story. The treatment now exists only in the Boston University archives.

Asimov said in 1969 that he had "the happiest of all my associations with science fiction magazines" with Fantasy & Science Fiction; "I have no complaints about Astounding, Galaxy, or any of the rest, heaven knows, but F&SF has become something special to me". Beginning in 1977, Asimov lent his name to Isaac Asimov's Science Fiction Magazine (now Asimov's Science Fiction) and wrote an editorial for each issue. There was also a short-lived Asimov's SF Adventure Magazine and a companion Asimov's Science Fiction Anthology reprint series, published as magazines (in the same manner as the stablemates Ellery Queen's Mystery Magazines and Alfred Hitchcock's Mystery Magazines "anthologies").

Due to pressure by fans on Asimov to write another book in his Foundation series, he did so with Foundation's Edge (1982) and Foundation and Earth (1986), and then went back to before the original trilogy with Prelude to Foundation (1988) and Forward the Foundation (1992), his last novel.

Popular science 

Asimov and two colleagues published a textbook in 1949, with two more editions by 1969. During the late 1950s and 1960s, Asimov substantially decreased his fiction output (he published only four adult novels between 1957's The Naked Sun and 1982's Foundation's Edge, two of which were mysteries). He greatly increased his nonfiction production, writing mostly on science topics; the launch of Sputnik in 1957 engendered public concern over a "science gap". Asimov explained in The Rest of the Robots that he had been unable to write substantial fiction since the summer of 1958, and observers understood him as saying that his fiction career had ended, or was permanently interrupted. Asimov recalled in 1969 that "the United States went into a kind of tizzy, and so did I. I was overcome by the ardent desire to write popular science for an America that might be in great danger through its neglect of science, and a number of publishers got an equally ardent desire to publish popular science for the same reason".

Fantasy and Science Fiction invited Asimov to continue his regular nonfiction column, begun in the now-folded bimonthly companion magazine Venture Science Fiction Magazine. The first of 399 monthly F&SF columns appeared in November 1958 and they continued until his terminal illness. These columns, periodically collected into books by Doubleday, gave Asimov a reputation as a "Great Explainer" of science; he described them as his only popular science writing in which he never had to assume complete ignorance of the subjects on the part of his readers. The column was ostensibly dedicated to popular science but Asimov had complete editorial freedom, and wrote about contemporary social issues in essays such as "Thinking About Thinking" and "Knock Plastic!". In 1975 he wrote of these essays: "I get more pleasure out of them than out of any other writing assignment."

Asimov's first wide-ranging reference work, The Intelligent Man's Guide to Science (1960), was nominated for a National Book Award, and in 1963 he won a Hugo Award—his first—for his essays for F&SF. The popularity of his science books and the income he derived from them allowed him to give up most academic responsibilities and become a full-time freelance writer. He encouraged other science fiction writers to write popular science, stating in 1967 that "the knowledgeable, skillful science writer is worth his weight in contracts", with "twice as much work as he can possibly handle".

The great variety of information covered in Asimov's writings prompted Kurt Vonnegut to ask, "How does it feel to know everything?" Asimov replied that he only knew how it felt to have the 'reputation' of omniscience: "Uneasy". Floyd C. Gale said that "Asimov has a rare talent. He can make your mental mouth water over dry facts", and "science fiction's loss has been science popularization's gain". Asimov said that "Of all the writing I do, fiction, non-fiction, adult, or juvenile, these F & SF articles are by far the most fun". He regretted, however, that he had less time for fiction—causing dissatisfied readers to send him letters of complaint—stating in 1969 that "In the last ten years, I've done a couple of novels, some collections, a dozen or so stories, but that's nothing".

In his essay "To Tell a Chemist" (1965), Asimov proposed a simple shibboleth for distinguishing chemists from non-chemists: ask the person to read the word "unionized". Chemists, he noted, will read un-ionized (electrically neutral), while non-chemists will read union-ized (belonging to a trade union).

Coined terms 
Asimov coined the term "robotics" in his 1941 story "Liar!", though he later remarked that he believed then that he was merely using an existing word, as he stated in Gold ("The Robot Chronicles"). While acknowledging the Oxford Dictionary reference, he incorrectly states that the word was first printed about one third of the way down the first column of page 100, Astounding Science Fiction, March 1942 printing of his short story "Runaround".

In the same story, Asimov also coined the term "positronic" (the counterpart to "electronic" for positrons).

Asimov coined the term "psychohistory" in his Foundation stories to name a fictional branch of science which combines history, sociology, and mathematical statistics to make general predictions about the future behavior of very large groups of people, such as the Galactic Empire. Asimov said later that he should have called it psychosociology. It was first introduced in the five short stories (1942–1944) which would later be collected as the 1951 fix-up novel Foundation. Somewhat later, the term "psychohistory" was applied by others to research of the effects of psychology on history.

Other writings 
In addition to his interest in science, Asimov was interested in history. Starting in the 1960s, he wrote 14 popular history books, including The Greeks: A Great Adventure (1965), The Roman Republic (1966), The Roman Empire (1967), The Egyptians (1967) The Near East: 10,000 Years of History (1968), and Asimov's Chronology of the World (1991).

He published Asimov's Guide to the Bible in two volumes—covering the Old Testament in 1967 and the New Testament in 1969—and then combined them into one 1,300-page volume in 1981. Complete with maps and tables, the guide goes through the books of the Bible in order, explaining the history of each one and the political influences that affected it, as well as biographical information about the important characters. His interest in literature manifested itself in several annotations of literary works, including Asimov's Guide to Shakespeare (1970), Asimov's Annotated Don Juan (1972), Asimov's Annotated Paradise Lost (1974), and The Annotated Gulliver's Travels (1980).

Asimov was also a noted mystery author and a frequent contributor to Ellery Queen's Mystery Magazine. He began by writing science fiction mysteries such as his Wendell Urth stories, but soon moved on to writing "pure" mysteries. He published two full-length mystery novels, and wrote 66 stories about the Black Widowers, a group of men who met monthly for dinner, conversation, and a puzzle. He got the idea for the Widowers from his own association in a stag group called the Trap Door Spiders, and all of the main characters (with the exception of the waiter, Henry, who he admitted resembled Wodehouse's Jeeves) were modeled after his closest friends. A parody of the Black Widowers, "An Evening with the White Divorcés," was written by author, critic, and librarian Jon L. Breen. Asimov joked, "all I can do ... is to wait until I catch him in a dark alley, someday."

Toward the end of his life, Asimov published a series of collections of limericks, mostly written by himself, starting with Lecherous Limericks, which appeared in 1975. Limericks: Too Gross, whose title displays Asimov's love of puns, contains 144 limericks by Asimov and an equal number by John Ciardi. He even created a slim volume of Sherlockian limericks. Asimov featured Yiddish humor in Azazel, The Two Centimeter Demon. The two main characters, both Jewish, talk over dinner, or lunch, or breakfast, about anecdotes of "George" and his friend Azazel. Asimov's Treasury of Humor is both a working joke book and a treatise propounding his views on humor theory. According to Asimov, the most essential element of humor is an abrupt change in point of view, one that suddenly shifts focus from the important to the trivial, or from the sublime to the ridiculous.

Particularly in his later years, Asimov to some extent cultivated an image of himself as an amiable lecher. In 1971, as a response to the popularity of sexual guidebooks such as The Sensuous Woman (by "J") and The Sensuous Man (by "M"), Asimov published The Sensuous Dirty Old Man under the byline "Dr. 'A (although his full name was printed on the paperback edition, first published 1972). However, by 2016, some of Asimov's behavior towards women was described as sexual harassment and cited as an example of historically problematic behavior by men in science fiction communities.

Asimov published three volumes of autobiography. In Memory Yet Green (1979) and In Joy Still Felt (1980) cover his life up to 1978. The third volume, I. Asimov: A Memoir (1994), covered his whole life (rather than following on from where the second volume left off). The epilogue was written by his widow Janet Asimov after his death. The book won a Hugo Award in 1995. Janet Asimov edited It's Been a Good Life (2002), a condensed version of his three autobiographies. He also published three volumes of retrospectives of his writing, Opus 100 (1969), Opus 200 (1979), and Opus 300 (1984).

In 1987, the Asimovs co-wrote How to Enjoy Writing: A Book of Aid and Comfort. In it they offer advice on how to maintain a positive attitude and stay productive when dealing with discouragement, distractions, rejection, and thick-headed editors. The book includes many quotations, essays, anecdotes, and husband-wife dialogues about the ups and downs of being an author.

Asimov and Star Trek creator Gene Roddenberry developed a unique relationship during Star Treks initial launch in the late 1960s. Asimov wrote a critical essay on Star Treks scientific accuracy for TV Guide magazine. Roddenberry retorted respectfully with a personal letter explaining the limitations of accuracy when writing a weekly series. Asimov corrected himself with a follow-up essay to TV Guide claiming that despite its inaccuracies, Star Trek was a fresh and intellectually challenging science fiction television show. The two remained friends to the point where Asimov even served as an advisor on a number of Star Trek projects.

In 1973, Asimov published a proposal for calendar reform, called the World Season Calendar. It divides the year into four seasons (named A–D) of 13 weeks (91 days) each. This allows days to be named, e.g., "D-73" instead of December 1 (due to December 1 being the 73rd day of the 4th quarter). An extra 'year day' is added for a total of 365 days.

Awards and recognition 
Asimov won more than a dozen annual awards for particular works of science fiction and a half-dozen lifetime awards.
He also received 14 honorary doctorate degrees from universities.
 1955 – Guest of Honor at the 13th World Science Fiction Convention
 1957 – Thomas Alva Edison Foundation Award for best science book for youth, for Building Blocks of the Universe
 1960 – Howard W. Blakeslee Award from the American Heart Association for The Living River
 1962 – Boston University's Publication Merit Award
 1963 – A special Hugo Award for "adding science to science fiction," for essays published in The Magazine of Fantasy and Science Fiction
 1963 – Fellow of the American Academy of Arts and Sciences
 1964 – The Science Fiction Writers of America voted "Nightfall" (1941) the all-time best science fiction short story
 1965 – James T. Grady Award of the American Chemical Society (now called the James T. Grady-James H. Stack Award for Interpreting Chemistry)
 1966 – Best All-time Novel Series Hugo Award for the Foundation trilogy
 1967 – Edward E. Smith Memorial Award
 1967 – AAAS-Westinghouse Science Writing Award for Magazine Writing, for essay "Over the Edge of the Universe" (in the March 1967 Harper's Magazine)
 1972 – Nebula Award for Best Novel for The Gods Themselves
 1973 – Hugo Award for Best Novel for The Gods Themselves
 1973 – Locus Award for Best Novel for The Gods Themselves
 1975 – Golden Plate Award of the American Academy of Achievement
 1975 – Klumpke-Roberts Award "for outstanding contributions to the public understanding and appreciation of astronomy"
 1975 – Locus Award for Best Reprint Anthology for Before the Golden Age
 1977 – Hugo Award for Best Novelette for The Bicentennial Man
 1977 – Nebula Award for Best Novelette for The Bicentennial Man
 1977 – Locus Award for Best Novelette for The Bicentennial Man
 1981 – An asteroid, 5020 Asimov, was named in his honor
 1981 – Locus Award for Best Non-Fiction Book for In Joy Still Felt: The Autobiography of Isaac Asimov, 1954–1978
 1983 – Hugo Award for Best Novel for Foundation's Edge
 1983 – Locus Award for Best Science Fiction Novel for Foundation's Edge
 1984 – Humanist of the Year
 1986 – The Science Fiction and Fantasy Writers of America named him its 8th SFWA Grand Master (presented in 1987).
 1987 – Locus Award for Best Short Story for "Robot Dreams"
 1992 – Hugo Award for Best Novelette for "Gold"
 1995 – Hugo Award for Best Non-Fiction Book for I. Asimov: A Memoir
 1995 – Locus Award for Best Non-Fiction Book for I. Asimov: A Memoir
 1996 – A 1946 Retro-Hugo for Best Novel of 1945 was given at the 1996 WorldCon for "The Mule", the 7th Foundation story, published in Astounding Science Fiction
 1997 – The Science Fiction and Fantasy Hall of Fame inducted Asimov in its second class of two deceased and two living persons, along with H. G. Wells.
 2000 – Asimov was featured on a stamp in Israel
 2001 – The Isaac Asimov Memorial Debates at the Hayden Planetarium in New York were inaugurated
 2009 – A crater on the planet Mars, Asimov, was named in his honor
 2010 – In the US Congress bill about the designation of the National Robotics Week as an annual event, a tribute to Isaac Asimov is as follows:
 "Whereas the second week in April each year is designated as 'National Robotics Week', recognizing the accomplishments of Isaac Asimov, who immigrated to America, taught science, wrote science books for children and adults, first used the term robotics, developed the Three Laws of Robotics, and died in April 1992: Now, therefore, be it resolved ..."
 2015 – Selected as a member of the New York State Writers Hall of Fame.
 2016 – A 1941 Retro-Hugo for Best Short Story of 1940 was given at the 2016 WorldCon for Robbie, his first positronic robot story, published in Super Science Stories, September 1940
 2018 – A 1943 Retro-Hugo for Best Short Story of 1942 was given at the 2018 WorldCon for Foundation, published in Astounding Science-Fiction, May 1942

Writing style 

Asimov was his own secretary, typist, indexer, proofreader, and literary agent. He wrote a typed first draft composed at the keyboard at 90 words per minute; he imagined an ending first, then a beginning, then "let everything in-between work itself out as I come to it". (Asimov used an outline only once, later describing it as "like trying to play the piano from inside a straitjacket".) After correcting a draft by hand, he retyped the document as the final copy and only made one revision with minor editor-requested changes; a word processor did not save him much time, Asimov said, because 95% of the first draft was unchanged.

After disliking making multiple revisions of "Black Friar of the Flame", Asimov refused to make major, second, or non-editorial revisions ("like chewing used gum"), stating that "too large a revision, or too many revisions, indicate that the piece of writing is a failure. In the time it would take to salvage such a failure, I could write a new piece altogether and have infinitely more fun in the process". He submitted "failures" to another editor.

Asimov's fiction style is extremely unornamented. In 1980, science fiction scholar James Gunn wrote of I, Robot:

Asimov addressed such criticism in 1989 at the beginning of Nemesis:

Gunn cited examples of a more complex style, such as the climax of "Liar!". Sharply drawn characters occur at key junctures of his storylines: Susan Calvin in "Liar!" and "Evidence", Arkady Darell in Second Foundation, Elijah Baley in The Caves of Steel, and Hari Seldon in the Foundation prequels.

Other than books by Gunn and Joseph Patrouch, there is relatively little literary criticism on Asimov (particularly when compared to the sheer volume of his output). Cowart and Wymer's Dictionary of Literary Biography (1981) gives a possible reason:

Gunn's and Patrouch's studies of Asimov both state that a clear, direct prose style is still a style. Gunn's 1982 book comments in detail on each of Asimov's novels. He does not praise all of Asimov's fiction (nor does Patrouch), but calls some passages in The Caves of Steel "reminiscent of Proust". When discussing how that novel depicts night falling over futuristic New York City, Gunn says that Asimov's prose "need not be ashamed anywhere in literary society".

Although he prided himself on his unornamented prose style (for which he credited Clifford D. Simak as an early influence), and said in 1973 that his style had not changed, Asimov also enjoyed giving his longer stories complicated narrative structures, often by arranging chapters in nonchronological ways. Some readers have been put off by this, complaining that the nonlinearity is not worth the trouble and adversely affects the clarity of the story. For example, the first third of The Gods Themselves begins with Chapter 6, then backtracks to fill in earlier material. (John Campbell advised Asimov to begin his stories as late in the plot as possible. This advice helped Asimov create "Reason", one of the early Robot stories). Patrouch found that the interwoven and nested flashbacks of The Currents of Space did serious harm to that novel, to such an extent that only a "dyed-in-the-kyrt Asimov fan" could enjoy it. In his later novel Nemesis one group of characters lives in the "present" and another group starts in the "past", beginning 15 years earlier and gradually moving toward the time of the first group.

Alien life 
Asimov once explained that his reluctance to write about aliens came from an incident early in his career when Astoundings editor John Campbell rejected one of his science fiction stories because the alien characters were portrayed as superior to the humans. The nature of the rejection led him to believe that Campbell may have based his bias towards humans in stories on a real-world racial bias. Unwilling to write only weak alien races, and concerned that a confrontation would jeopardize his and Campbell's friendship, he decided he would not write about aliens at all. Nevertheless, in response to these criticisms, he wrote The Gods Themselves, which contains aliens and alien sex. The book won the Nebula Award for Best Novel in 1972, and the Hugo Award for Best Novel in 1973. Asimov said that of all his writings, he was most proud of the middle section of The Gods Themselves, the part that deals with those themes.

In the Hugo Award-winning novelette "Gold", Asimov describes an author, based on himself, who has one of his books (The Gods Themselves) adapted into a "compu-drama", essentially photo-realistic computer animation. The director criticizes the fictionalized Asimov ("Gregory Laborian") for having an extremely nonvisual style, making it difficult to adapt his work, and the author explains that he relies on ideas and dialogue rather than description to get his points across.

Romance and women 

In the early days of science fiction some authors and critics felt that the romantic elements were inappropriate in science fiction stories, which were supposedly to be focused on science and technology. Isaac Asimov was a supporter of this point of view, expressed in his 1938-1939 letters to Astounding, where he described such elements as "mush" and "slop". To his dismay, these letters were met with a strong opposition.

Asimov attributed the lack of romance and sex in his fiction to the "early imprinting" from starting his writing career when he had never been on a date and "didn't know anything about girls". He was sometimes criticized for the general absence of sex (and of extraterrestrial life) in his science fiction. He claimed he wrote The Gods Themselves to respond to these criticisms, which often came from New Wave science fiction (and often British) writers. The second part (of three) of the novel is set on an alien world with three sexes, and the sexual behavior of these creatures is extensively depicted.

Views

Religion 
Asimov was an atheist, a humanist, and a rationalist. He did not oppose religious conviction in others, but he frequently railed against superstitious and pseudoscientific beliefs that tried to pass themselves off as genuine science. During his childhood, his father and mother observed the traditions of Orthodox Judaism less stringently than they had in Petrovichi; they did not force their beliefs upon young Isaac, and  he grew up without strong religious influences, coming to believe that the Torah represented Hebrew mythology in the same way that the Iliad recorded Greek mythology. When he was 13, he chose not to have a bar mitzvah. As his books Treasury of Humor and Asimov Laughs Again record, Asimov was willing to tell jokes involving God, Satan, the Garden of Eden, Jerusalem, and other religious topics, expressing the viewpoint that a good joke can do more to provoke thought than hours of philosophical discussion.

For a brief while, his father worked in the local synagogue to enjoy the familiar surroundings and, as Isaac put it, "shine as a learned scholar" versed in the sacred writings. This scholarship was a seed for his later authorship and publication of Asimov's Guide to the Bible, an analysis of the historic foundations for the Old and New Testaments. For many years, Asimov called himself an atheist; he considered the term somewhat inadequate, as it described what he did not believe rather than what he did. Eventually, he described himself as a "humanist" and considered that term more practical. Asimov continued to identify himself as a secular Jew, as stated in his introduction to Jack Dann's anthology of Jewish science fiction, Wandering Stars: "I attend no services and follow no ritual and have never undergone that curious puberty rite, the Bar Mitzvah. It doesn't matter. I am Jewish."

When asked in an interview in 1982 if he was an atheist, Asimov replied,

Likewise, he said about religious education: "I would not be satisfied to have my kids choose to be religious without trying to argue them out of it, just as I would not be satisfied to have them decide to smoke regularly or engage in any other practice I consider detrimental to mind or body."

In his last volume of autobiography, Asimov wrote,

The same memoir states his belief that Hell is "the drooling dream of a sadist" crudely affixed to an all-merciful God; if even human governments were willing to curtail cruel and unusual punishments, wondered Asimov, why would punishment in the afterlife not be restricted to a limited term? Asimov rejected the idea that a human belief or action could merit infinite punishment. If an afterlife existed, he claimed, the longest and most severe punishment would be reserved for those who "slandered God by inventing Hell".

Asimov said about using religious motifs in his writing:

Politics 
Asimov became a staunch supporter of the Democratic Party during the New Deal, and thereafter remained a political liberal. He was a vocal opponent of the Vietnam War in the 1960s and in a television interview during the early 1970s he publicly endorsed George McGovern. He was unhappy about what he considered an "irrationalist" viewpoint taken by many radical political activists from the late 1960s and onwards. In his second volume of autobiography, In Joy Still Felt, Asimov recalled meeting the counterculture figure Abbie Hoffman. Asimov's impression was that the 1960s' counterculture heroes had ridden an emotional wave which, in the end, left them stranded in a "no-man's land of the spirit" from which he wondered if they would ever return.

Asimov vehemently opposed Richard Nixon, considering him "a crook and a liar". He closely followed Watergate, and was pleased when the president was forced to resign. Asimov was dismayed over the pardon extended to Nixon by his successor: "I was not impressed by the argument that it has spared the nation an ordeal. To my way of thinking, the ordeal was necessary to make certain it would never happen again."

After Asimov's name appeared in the mid-1960s on a list of people the Communist Party USA "considered amenable" to its goals, the FBI investigated him. Because of his academic background, the bureau briefly considered Asimov as a possible candidate for known Soviet spy ROBPROF, but found nothing suspicious in his life or background.

Asimov appeared to hold an equivocal attitude towards Israel. In his first autobiography, he indicates his support for the safety of Israel, though insisting that he was not a Zionist. In his third autobiography, Asimov stated his opposition to the creation of a Jewish state, on the grounds that he was opposed to having nation-states in general, and supported the notion of a single humanity. Asimov especially worried about the safety of Israel given that it had been created among hostile Muslim neighbors, and said that Jews had merely created for themselves another "Jewish ghetto".

Social issues 
Asimov believed that "science fiction ... serve[s] the good of humanity". He considered himself a feminist even before women's liberation became a widespread movement; he argued that the issue of women's rights was closely connected to that of population control. Furthermore, he believed that homosexuality must be considered a "moral right" on population grounds, as must all consenting adult sexual activity that does not lead to reproduction. He issued many appeals for population control, reflecting a perspective articulated by people from Thomas Malthus through Paul R. Ehrlich.

In a 1988 interview by Bill Moyers, Asimov proposed computer-aided learning, where people would use computers to find information on subjects in which they were interested. He thought this would make learning more interesting, since people would have the freedom to choose what to learn, and would help spread knowledge around the world. Also, the one-to-one model would let students learn at their own pace. Asimov thought that people would live in space by 2019.

In 1983 Asimov wrote:

He continues on education:

Sexual harassment 

Asimov would often fondle, kiss and pinch women at conventions and elsewhere without regard for their consent. According to Alec Nevala-Lee, author of an Asimov biography  and writer on the history of science fiction, he often defended himself by saying that far from showing objections, these women cooperated. In a 1971 satirical piece, The Sensuous Dirty Old Man, Asimov wrote: "The question then is not whether or not a girl should be touched. The question is merely where, when, and how she should be touched."

According to Nevala-Lee, however, "many of these encounters were clearly nonconsensual." He wrote that Asimov's behaviour, as a leading science-fiction author and personality, contributed to an undesirable atmosphere for women in the male-dominated science fiction community. In support of this, he quoted some of Asimov's contemporary fellow-authors such as Judith Merril, Harlan Ellison and Frederik Pohl, as well as editors such as Timothy Seldes. Additional specific incidents were reported by other people including Edward L. Ferman, long-time editor of The Magazine of Fantasy & Science Fiction, who wrote "... instead of shaking my date's hand, he shook her left breast".

Environment and population 
Asimov's defense of civil applications of nuclear power, even after the Three Mile Island nuclear power plant incident, damaged his relations with some of his fellow liberals. In a letter reprinted in Yours, Isaac Asimov, he states that although he would prefer living in "no danger whatsoever" than near a nuclear reactor, he would still prefer a home near a nuclear power plant than in a slum on Love Canal or near "a Union Carbide plant producing methyl isocyanate", the latter being a reference to the Bhopal disaster.

In the closing years of his life, Asimov blamed the deterioration of the quality of life that he perceived in New York City on the shrinking tax base caused by the middle-class flight to the suburbs, though he continued to support high taxes on the middle class to pay for social programs. His last nonfiction book, Our Angry Earth (1991, co-written with his long-time friend, science fiction author Frederik Pohl), deals with elements of the environmental crisis such as overpopulation, oil dependence, war, global warming, and the destruction of the ozone layer. In response to being presented by Bill Moyers with the question "What do you see happening to the idea of dignity to human species if this population growth continues at its present rate?", Asimov responded:

Other authors 
Asimov enjoyed the writings of J. R. R. Tolkien, and used The Lord of the Rings as a plot point in a Black Widowers story, titled Nothing like Murder. In the essay "All or Nothing" (for The Magazine of Fantasy and Science Fiction, Jan 1981), Asimov said that he admired Tolkien and that he had read The Lord of the Rings five times. (The feelings were mutual, with Tolkien saying that he had enjoyed Asimov's science fiction. This would make Asimov an exception to Tolkien's earlier claim that he rarely found "any modern books" that were interesting to him.)

He acknowledged other writers as superior to himself in talent, saying of Harlan Ellison, "He is (in my opinion) one of the best writers in the world, far more skilled at the art than I am." Asimov disapproved of the New Wave's growing influence, stating in 1967 "I want science fiction. I think science fiction isn't really science fiction if it lacks science. And I think the better and truer the science, the better and truer the science fiction".

The feelings of friendship and respect between Asimov and Arthur C. Clarke were demonstrated by the so-called "Clarke–Asimov Treaty of Park Avenue", negotiated as they shared a cab in New York. This stated that Asimov was required to insist that Clarke was the best science fiction writer in the world (reserving second-best for himself), while Clarke was required to insist that Asimov was the best science writer in the world (reserving second-best for himself). Thus, the dedication in Clarke's book Report on Planet Three (1972) reads: "In accordance with the terms of the Clarke–Asimov treaty, the second-best science writer dedicates this book to the second-best science-fiction writer."

Asimov became a fan of mystery stories at the same time as science fiction. He preferred to read the former because "I read every [science fiction] story keenly aware that it might be worse than mine, in which case I had no patience with it, or that it might be better, in which case I felt miserable". Asimov wrote "I make no secret of the fact that in my mysteries I use Agatha Christie as my model. In my opinion, her mysteries are the best ever written, far better than the Sherlock Holmes stories, and Hercule Poirot is the best detective fiction has seen. Why should I not use as my model what I consider the best?" He enjoyed Sherlock Holmes, but considered Arthur Conan Doyle to be "a slapdash and sloppy writer."

Asimov also enjoyed humorous stories, particularly those of P. G. Wodehouse.

In non-fiction writing, Asimov particularly admired the writing style of Martin Gardner, and tried to emulate it in his own science books. On meeting Gardner for the first time in 1965, Asimov told him this, to which Gardner answered that he had based his own style on Asimov's.

Influence 
Paul Krugman, holder of a Nobel Prize in Economics, stated Asimov's concept of psychohistory inspired him to become an economist.

John Jenkins, who has reviewed the vast majority of Asimov's written output, once observed, "It has been pointed out that most science fiction writers since the 1950s have been affected by Asimov, either modeling their style on his or deliberately avoiding anything like his style." Along with such figures as Bertrand Russell and Karl Popper, Asimov left his mark as one of the most distinguished interdisciplinarians of the 20th century. "Few individuals", writes James L. Christian, "understood better than Isaac Asimov what synoptic thinking is all about. His almost 500 books—which he wrote as a specialist, a knowledgeable authority, or just an excited layman—range over almost all conceivable subjects: the sciences, history, literature, religion, and of course, science fiction."

Bibliography 

Depending on the counting convention used, and including all titles, charts, and edited collections, there may be currently over 500 books in Asimov's bibliography—as well as his individual short stories, individual essays, and criticism. For his 100th, 200th, and 300th books (based on his personal count), Asimov published Opus 100 (1969), Opus 200 (1979), and Opus 300 (1984), celebrating his writing. An extensive bibliography of Isaac Asimov's works has been compiled by Ed Seiler.  He published enough that his book writing rate could be analysed, showing that the writing became faster as he wrote more.

An online exhibit in West Virginia University Libraries' virtually complete Asimov Collection displays features, visuals, and descriptions of some of his over 600 books, games, audio recordings, videos, and wall charts. Many first, rare, and autographed editions are in the Libraries' Rare Book Room. Book jackets and autographs are presented online along with descriptions and images of children's books, science fiction art, multimedia, and other materials in the collection.

Science fiction

"Greater Foundation" series 

The Robot series was originally separate from the Foundation series. The Galactic Empire novels were published as independent stories, set earlier in the same future as Foundation. Later in life, Asimov synthesized the Robot series into a single coherent "history" that appeared in the extension of the Foundation series.

All of these books were published by Doubleday & Co, except the original Foundation trilogy which was originally published by Gnome Books before being bought and republished by Doubleday.
 The Robot series:
  (first Elijah Baley SF-crime novel)
  (second Elijah Baley SF-crime novel)
  (third Elijah Baley SF-crime novel)
  (sequel to the Elijah Baley trilogy)
 Galactic Empire novels:
  (early Galactic Empire)
  (long before the Empire)
  (Republic of Trantor still expanding)
 Foundation prequels:
 
 
 Original Foundation trilogy:
 
  (also published with the title 'The Man Who Upset the Universe' as a 35¢ Ace paperback, D-125, in about 1952)
 
 Extended Foundation series:

Lucky Starr series (as Paul French) 

All published by Doubleday & Co
 David Starr, Space Ranger (1952)
 Lucky Starr and the Pirates of the Asteroids (1953)
 Lucky Starr and the Oceans of Venus (1954)
 Lucky Starr and the Big Sun of Mercury (1956)
 Lucky Starr and the Moons of Jupiter (1957)
 Lucky Starr and the Rings of Saturn (1958)

Norby Chronicles (with Janet Asimov) 

All published by Walker & Company
 Norby, the Mixed-Up Robot (1983)
 Norby's Other Secret (1984)
 Norby and the Lost Princess (1985)
 Norby and the Invaders (1985)
 Norby and the Queen's Necklace (1986)
 Norby Finds a Villain (1987)
 Norby Down to Earth (1988)
 Norby and Yobo's Great Adventure (1989)
 Norby and the Oldest Dragon (1990)
 Norby and the Court Jester (1991)

Novels not part of a series 
Novels marked with an asterisk (*) have minor connections to Foundation universe.
 The End of Eternity (1955), Doubleday (*)
 Fantastic Voyage (1966), Bantam Books (paperback) and Houghton Mifflin (hardback) (a novelization of the movie)
 The Gods Themselves (1972), Doubleday
 Fantastic Voyage II: Destination Brain (1987), Doubleday (not a sequel to Fantastic Voyage, but a similar, independent story)
 Nemesis (1989), Bantam Doubleday Dell (*)
 Nightfall (1990), Doubleday, with Robert Silverberg (based on "Nightfall", a 1941 short story written by Asimov)
 Child of Time (1992), Bantam Doubleday Dell, with Robert Silverberg (based on "The Ugly Little Boy", a 1958 short story written by Asimov)
 The Positronic Man (1992), Bantam Doubleday Dell, with Robert Silverberg (*) (based on The Bicentennial Man, a 1976 novella written by Asimov)

Short-story collections

Mysteries

Novels 
 The Death Dealers (1958), Avon Books, republished as A Whiff of Death by Walker & Company
 Murder at the ABA (1976), Doubleday, also published as Authorized Murder

Short-story collections

Black Widowers series 

 Tales of the Black Widowers (1974), Doubleday
 More Tales of the Black Widowers (1976), Doubleday
 Casebook of the Black Widowers (1980), Doubleday
 Banquets of the Black Widowers (1984), Doubleday
 Puzzles of the Black Widowers (1990), Doubleday
 The Return of the Black Widowers (2003), Carroll & Graf

Other mysteries 
 Asimov's Mysteries (1968), Doubleday
 The Key Word and Other Mysteries (1977), Walker
 The Union Club Mysteries (1983), Doubleday
 The Disappearing Man and Other Mysteries (1985), Walker
 The Best Mysteries of Isaac Asimov (1986), Doubleday

Nonfiction

Popular science

Collections of Asimov's essays for F&SF
The following books collected essays which were originally published as monthly columns in The Magazine of Fantasy and Science Fiction and collected by Doubleday & Co
 Fact and Fancy (1962)
 View from a Height (1963)
 Adding a Dimension (1964)
 Of Time and Space and Other Things (1965)
 From Earth to Heaven (1966)
 Science, Numbers, and I (1968)
 The Solar System and Back (1970)
 The Stars in Their Courses (1971)
 The Left Hand of the Electron (1972)
 The Tragedy of the Moon (1973)
 Asimov On Astronomy (updated version of essays in previous collections) (1974) 
 Asimov On Chemistry (updated version of essays in previous collections) (1974)
 Of Matters Great and Small (1975)
 Asimov On Physics (updated version of essays in previous collections) (1976) 
 The Planet That Wasn't (1976)
 Asimov On Numbers (updated version of essays in previous collections) (1976)
 Quasar, Quasar, Burning Bright (1977)
 The Road to Infinity (1979)
 The Sun Shines Bright (1981)
 Counting the Eons (1983)
 X Stands for Unknown (1984)
 The Subatomic Monster (1985)
 Far as Human Eye Could See (1987)
 The Relativity of Wrong (1988)
 Asimov on Science: A 30 Year Retrospective 1959–1989 (1989) (features the first essay in the introduction)
 Out of the Everywhere (1990)
 The Secret of the Universe (1991)

Other general science essay collections
 Only a Trillion (1957), Abelard-Schuman, ; (1976) revised and updated ed.
 Is Anyone There? (1967), Doubleday,  (which includes the article in which he coined the term "spome")
 Today and Tomorrow and— (1973), Doubleday
 Science Past, Science Future (1975), Doubleday, 
 Please Explain (1975), Houghton Mifflin, 
 Life and Time (1978), Doubleday
 The Roving Mind (1983), Prometheus Books, new edition 1997, 
 The Dangers of Intelligence (1986), Houghton Mifflin
 Past, Present and Future (1987), Prometheus Books, 
 The Tyrannosaurus Prescription (1989), Prometheus Books
 Frontiers (1990), Dutton
 Frontiers II (1993), Dutton

Other science books by Asimov
 The Chemicals of Life (1954), Abelard-Schuman 
 Inside the Atom (1956), Abelard-Schuman, 
 Building Blocks of the Universe (1957; revised 1974), Abelard-Schuman, 
 The World of Carbon (1958), Abelard-Schuman, 
 The World of Nitrogen (1958), Abelard-Schuman, 
 Words of Science and the History Behind Them (1959), Houghton Mifflin 
 The Clock We Live On (1959), Abelard-Schuman, 
 Breakthroughs in Science (1959), Houghton Mifflin, 
 Realm of Numbers (1959), Houghton Mifflin, 
 Realm of Measure (1960), Houghton Mifflin
 The Wellsprings of Life (1960), Abelard-Schuman, 
 Life and Energy (1962), Doubleday, 
 The Genetic Code (1962), The Orion Press
 The Human Body: Its Structure and Operation (1963), Houghton Mifflin,  (revised)
 The Human Brain: Its Capacities and Functions (1963), Houghton Mifflin, 
 Planets for Man (with Stephen H. Dole) (1964), Random House, reprinted by RAND in 2007 
 An Easy Introduction to the Slide Rule (1965), Houghton Mifflin, 
 The Intelligent Man's Guide to Science (1965), Basic Books
 The title varied with each of the four editions, the last being Asimov's New Guide to Science (1984) 
 The Universe: From Flat Earth to Quasar (1966), Walker, 
 The Neutrino (1966), Doubleday, ASIN B002JK525W
 Understanding Physics Vol. I, Motion, Sound, and Heat (1966), Walker, 
 Understanding Physics Vol. II, Light, Magnetism, and Electricity (1966), Walker, 
 Understanding Physics Vol. III, The Electron, Proton, and Neutron (1966), Walker, 
 Photosynthesis (1969), Basic Books, 
 Our World in Space (1974), New York Graphic, 
 Eyes on the Universe: A History of the Telescope (1976), Andre Deutsch Limited, 
 The Collapsing Universe (1977), Walker, 
 Extraterrestrial Civilizations (1979), Crown, 
 A Choice of Catastrophes (1979), Simon & Schuster, 
 Visions of the Universe with illustrations by Kazuaki Iwasaki (1981), Cosmos Store, 
 Exploring the Earth and the Cosmos (1982), Crown, 
 The Measure of the Universe (1983), Harper & Row
 Think About Space: Where Have We Been and Where Are We Going? with co-author Frank White (1989), Walker
 Asimov's Chronology of Science and Discovery (1989), Harper & Row, second edition adds content thru 1993, 
 Beginnings: The Story of Origins (1989), Walker
 Isaac Asimov's Guide to Earth and Space (1991), Random House, 
 Atom: Journey Across the Subatomic Cosmos (1991), Dutton, 
 Mysteries of Deep Space: Quasars, Pulsars and Black Holes (1994) 
 Earth's Moon (1988), Gareth Stevens, revised in 2003 by Richard Hantula 
 The Sun (1988), Gareth Stevens, revised in 2003 by Richard Hantula 
 The Earth (1988), Gareth Stevens, revised in 2004 by Richard Hantula 
 Jupiter (1989), Gareth Stevens, revised in 2004 by Richard Hantula 
 Venus (1990), Gareth Stevens, revised in 2004 by Richard Hantula

Literary works 
All published by Doubleday
 Asimov's Guide to Shakespeare, vols I and II (1970), 
 Asimov's Annotated "Don Juan" (1972)
 Asimov's Annotated "Paradise Lost" (1974)
 Familiar Poems, Annotated (1976)
 Asimov's The Annotated "Gulliver's Travels" (1980)
 Asimov's Annotated "Gilbert and Sullivan" (1988)

The Bible 
 Words from Genesis (1962), Houghton Mifflin
 Words from the Exodus (1963), Houghton Mifflin
 Asimov's Guide to the Bible, vols I and II (1967 and 1969, one-volume ed. 1981), Doubleday, 
 The Story of Ruth (1972), Doubleday, 
 In the Beginning (1981), Crown

Autobiography 

 In Memory Yet Green: The Autobiography of Isaac Asimov, 1920–1954 (1979, Doubleday)
 In Joy Still Felt: The Autobiography of Isaac Asimov, 1954–1978 (1980, Doubleday)
 I. Asimov: A Memoir (1994, Doubleday)
 It's Been a Good Life (2002, Prometheus Books), condensation of Asimov's three volumes of autobiography, edited by his widow, Janet Jeppson Asimov

History 
All published by Houghton Mifflin except where otherwise stated
 The Kite That Won the Revolution (1963), 
 The Greeks (1965)
 The Roman Republic (1966)
 The Roman Empire (1967)
 The Egyptians (1967)
 The Near East (1968)
 The Dark Ages (1968)
 Words from History (1968)
 The Shaping of England (1969)
 Constantinople: The Forgotten Empire (1970)
 The Land of Canaan (1971)
 The Shaping of France (1972)
 The Shaping of North America: From Earliest Times to 1763 (1973)
 The Birth of the United States: 1763–1816 (1974)
 Our Federal Union: The United States from 1816 to 1865 (1975), 
 The Golden Door: The United States from 1865 to 1918 (1977)
 Asimov's Chronology of the World (1991), HarperCollins, 
 The March of the Millennia (1991), with co-author Frank White, Walker & Company,

Humor 
  The Sensuous Dirty Old Man (1971) (As Dr. A), Walker & Company, 
 Isaac Asimov's Treasury of Humor (1971), Houghton Mifflin
 Lecherous Limericks (1975), Walker, 
 More Lecherous Limericks (1976), Walker, 
 Still More Lecherous Limericks (1977), Walker, 
 Limericks, Two Gross, with John Ciardi (1978), Norton, 
 A Grossery of Limericks, with John Ciardi (1981), Norton, 
 Limericks for Children (1984), Caedmon
 Asimov Laughs Again (1992), HarperCollins

On writing science fiction 
 Asimov on Science Fiction (1981), Doubleday
 Asimov's Galaxy (1989), Doubleday

Other nonfiction 
 Opus 100 (1969), Houghton Mifflin, 
 Asimov's Biographical Encyclopedia of Science and Technology (1964), Doubleday (revised edition 1972)
 Opus 200 (1979), Houghton Mifflin, 
 Isaac Asimov's Book of Facts (1979), Grosset & Dunlap, 
 Opus 300 (1984), Houghton Mifflin, 
 Our Angry Earth: A Ticking Ecological Bomb (1991), with co-author Frederik Pohl, Tor, .

Television, music, and film appearances 
 I Robot, a concept album by the Alan Parsons Project that examined some of Asimov's work
 The Last Word (1959)
 The Dick Cavett Show, four appearances 1968–71
 The Nature of Things (1969) 
 ABC News coverage of Apollo 11, 1969, with Fred Pohl, interviewed by Rod Serling
 David Frost interview program, August 1969. Frost asked Asimov if he had ever tried to find God and, after some initial evasion, Asimov answered, "God is much more intelligent than I am—let him try to find me."
 BBC Horizon "It's About Time" (1979), show hosted by Dudley Moore
 Target ... Earth? (1980)
 The David Letterman Show (1980) 
 NBC TV Speaking Freely, interviewed by Edwin Newman (1982)
 ARTS Network talk show hosted by Studs Terkel and Calvin Trillin, approximately (1982)
 Oltre New York (1986) 
 Voyage to the Outer Planets and Beyond (1986) 
 Gandahar (1987), a French animated science-fiction film by René Laloux. Asimov wrote the English translation for the film.
 Bill Moyers interview (1988) 
 Stranieri in America (1988) 
 Mythic Quest (2021), appears for a writer-themed backstory episode

Adaptations 
 Several of his stories ("The Dead Past", "Sucker Bait", "Satisfaction Guaranteed", "Reason", "Liar!", and "The Naked Sun") were adapted as television plays for the first three series of the science-fiction (later horror) anthology series Out of the Unknown between 1965 and 1969. Only The Dead Past and Sucker Bait (both from series one) are known to still exist entirely as 16mm telerecordings. Tele-snaps, brief audio recordings and video clips exist for Satisfaction Guaranteed and The Prophet (adapted from "Reason"), while only production stills, brief audio recordings and video clips exist for Liar!. Production stills and an almost complete audio recording exist for The Naked Sun.
 El robot embustero (1966), short film directed by Antonio Lara de Gavilán, based on short story "Liar!"
 A halhatatlanság halála (1977), TV movie directed by András Rajnai, based on novel The End of Eternity
 The Ugly Little Boy (1977), short film directed by Barry Morse and Donald W. Thompson, based on novelette The Ugly Little Boy
 All the Troubles of the World (1978), short film directed by Dianne Haak-Edson, based on short story "All the Troubles of the World"
 The End of Eternity (1987), film directed by Andrei Yermash, based on novel The End of Eternity
 Nightfall (1988), film directed by Paul Mayersberg, based on novelette "Nightfall"
 Robots (1988), film directed by Doug Smith and Kim Takal, based on the Robot series
 Feeling 109 (1988), short film directed by Richard Kletter, based on a story of Asimov
 Teach 109 (1989), TV movie directed by Richard Kletter, based on a story of Asimov (the same as The Android Affair)
 The Android Affair (1995), TV movie directed by Richard Kletter, based on a story of Asimov (the same as Teach 109)
 Bicentennial Man (1999), film directed by Chris Columbus, based on novelette "The Bicentennial Man" and on novel The Positronic Man
 Nightfall (2000), film directed by Gwyneth Gibby, based on novelette "Nightfall"
 I, Robot (2004), film directed by Alex Proyas, based on ideas of short stories of the Robot series
 Eagle Eye (2008), film directed by D. J. Caruso, loosely based on short story "All the Troubles of the World"
 Formula of Death (2012), TV movie directed by Behdad Avand Amini, based on novel The Death Dealers
 Spell My Name with an S (2014), short film directed by Samuel Ali, based on short story "Spell My Name with an S"
 Foundation (2021), series created by David S. Goyer and Josh Friedman, based on the Foundation series

Novelizations 
 Novel Fantastic Voyage, novelization of film Fantastic Voyage (1966)

References

Explanatory footnotes

Citations

General and cited sources 

 Asimov, Isaac. In Memory Yet Green (1979), New York: Avon, .
 In Joy Still Felt (1980), New York: Avon .
 I. Asimov: A Memoir (1994),  (hc),  (pb).
 Yours, Isaac Asimov (1996), edited by Stanley Asimov. New York: Doubleday .
 It's Been a Good Life (2002), edited by Janet Asimov. .
 Goldman, Stephen H., "Isaac Asimov", in Dictionary of Literary Biography, Vol. 8, Cowart and Wymer eds. (Gale Research, 1981), pp. 15–29.
 Gunn, James. "On Variations on a Robot", IASFM, July 1980, pp. 56–81.
 Isaac Asimov: The Foundations of Science Fiction (1982). .
 The Science of Science-Fiction Writing (2000). .

Further reading

External links 

 
 Asimov Online, a vast repository of information about Asimov, maintained by Asimov enthusiast Edward Seiler
 
 
 
 
 
 
 
 Jenkins' Spoiler-Laden Guide to Isaac Asimov, reviews of all of Asimov's books

 
20th-century births
1992 deaths
20th-century American male writers
20th-century American memoirists
20th-century American novelists
20th-century atheists
20th-century essayists
AIDS-related deaths in New York (state)
American alternate history writers
American biochemists
American essayists
American historians of science
American humanists
American humorists
American male essayists
American male novelists
American male short story writers
American mystery writers
American people of Russian-Jewish descent
American science fiction writers
American science writers
American short story writers
American skeptics
American writers of Russian descent
Analog Science Fiction and Fact people
Asimov's Science Fiction people
Atheist feminists
Bible commentators
Boston University faculty
Boys High School (Brooklyn) alumni
Columbia Graduate School of Arts and Sciences alumni
Columbia University School of General Studies alumni
Critics of religions
Date of birth unknown
Fellows of the American Academy of Arts and Sciences
Futurians
Historians of astronomy
Hugo Award-winning writers
Humor researchers
Jewish American atheists
Jewish American novelists
Jewish American short story writers
Jewish feminists
Jewish skeptics
Male feminists
Mensans
Naturalized citizens of the United States
Nebula Award winners
New York (state) Democrats
Novelists from Massachusetts
Novelists from New York (state)
People from Smolensk Oblast
People from the Upper West Side
Pulp fiction writers
SFWA Grand Masters
Science Fiction Hall of Fame inductees
Scientists from New York City
Soviet emigrants to the United States
United States Army non-commissioned officers
United States Navy civilians
Writers about religion and science
Writers from Brooklyn
Yiddish-speaking people